Glen Antonio Abrahams Martínez (born 5 March 1962) is a Costa Rican sprinter. He competed in the men's 100 metres at the 1984 Summer Olympics.

References

External links
 

1962 births
Living people
Athletes (track and field) at the 1984 Summer Olympics
Costa Rican male sprinters
Olympic athletes of Costa Rica